The Minnelusa Formation is a geologic formation in South Dakota. It preserves fossils dating back to the Carboniferous period.

See also

 List of fossiliferous stratigraphic units in South Dakota
 Paleontology in South Dakota

References
 

Carboniferous geology of South Dakota
Geologic formations of Nebraska